The AGA cooker oven is a Swedish oven and cooker. Invented and initially produced in Sweden, since 1957 all production has been located in the UK.

History
Originally developed to burn coal or anthracite, the Aga cooker was invented in 1922 by the Nobel Prize-winning Swedish physicist Gustaf Dalén (1869–1937), who was employed as the chief engineer of the Swedish AGA company (Swedish Svenska Aktiebolaget Gasaccumulator, English Swedish Gas Accumulator, Limited).

Dalén lost his sight in an explosion while developing his earlier invention, a porous substrate for storing gases, Agamassan. Forced to stay at home, Dalén discovered that his wife was exhausted by cooking. Although blind, he set out to develop a new stove that was capable of a range of culinary techniques and easy to use.

Adopting the principle of heat storage, he combined a heat source, two large hotplates and two ovens into one unit: the AGA Cooker. The cooker was introduced to the United Kingdom in 1929, and was manufactured there under licence in the early 1930s. Its popularity in certain parts of British society (owners of medium to large country houses) led to the coining of the term 'AGA saga' in the 1990s, referring to a genre of fiction set amongst stereotypical upper-middle-class society.

David Ogilvy was initially hired as an Aga cooker salesperson, before writing the 1935 sales manual for the product.

The cast-iron parts were cast at the Coalbrookdale foundry in the 1940s, where they were still made by the Aga Rangemaster Group until November 2017 when Middleby closed the site with the loss of 35 jobs.

Energy use
The average standard gas oven and hob uses , only 2.6% of the AGA's consumption.
AGA's own figures for expected energy consumption for their two-oven AGA support this criticism, suggesting average consumption of 40 litres of kerosene or diesel fuel per week, 60 litres of propane gas per week, 425 kW⋅h of natural gas per week, or 220 kW⋅h/week for the electric models. This would indicate that the smallest traditional two-oven gas AGA providing simple cooking functions (i.e. no water heating or central heating) consumes thirty-eight times as much as a standard gas oven and hob, almost as much gas in a week as a standard gas oven and hob in nine months.

AGA has provided an analysis of their own, which includes the steps taken to reduce energy consumption.

One owner, Kerstin Rodgers, has talked about how the AGA has reduced her electricity bills while making her gas bills "slightly higher", as the AGA reduces her usage of such things as electric heaters, the tumble dryer, electric kettle and toaster, and is not simply a cooker.

The vast majority of AGAs sold today are programmable and AGA announced an upgrade initiative in 2009, meaning that owners of older AGA cookers can have them modified so they are programmable. The latest model, the AGA Total Control, uses the same radiant heat to cook, but is designed to be switched off like a regular cooker when not in use, using far less energy as a result. Oil burning AGAs can be fitted with a modern pressure jet oil burner in place of the standard wick burner which burns the fuel more efficiently and so reduces oil consumption.

Models

AGA cookers are available in 2, 3, 4 and 5 oven models with the 4 and 5 oven versions wider than the others. AGA cookers have a boiling and simmering plate, or in models with one hotplate this can be set to either boiling or simmering mode.

While the classic AGA models are on all the time, the ovens and hotplates of the newer AGA cookers (AGA 60, Total Control, 3 Series) can be switched on and off as required and the hotplates on the Dual Control cookers can be switched on and off, meaning there is heat in to the room but energy is not used unnecessarily. The AGA 60 is the smallest in the range and is just 60 cm wide.

The AGA is known for its longevity, with many cookers still operating after more than 50 years. In 2009, in conjunction with  The Daily Telegraph and to celebrate the 80th anniversary of its founding, AGA set up a competition to find the oldest AGA still in use. There were thousands of entries, but the winning cooker was installed in 1932 and belonged to the Hett family of Sussex.

See also
 Aga Rangemaster Group

References

Further reading
 James, Tim (2002). Aga: The Story of a Kitchen Classic. Absolute Press. .

External links

Fireplaces
Cooking appliance brands
British brands
Ovens
Linde plc
Swedish inventions